Sierra Sur de Jaén may refer to various places in Spain:
Sierra Sur de Jaén, a mountain range of the Subbaetic system
Sierra Sur de Jaén (DO), a Spanish geographical indication for Vino de la Tierra wines 
Sierra Sur de Jaén (comarca), a comarca in Jaén Province